The June 1906 City of London by-election was held on 15 June 1906.  The by-election was held due to the resignation of the incumbent Conservative MP, Sir Edward Clarke.  It was won by the Conservative candidate Frederick Banbury, who was unopposed.

References

City of London by-election,06
City of London by-election,06
City of London by-election
1906,06
City of London,1906,06
1906,06,City of London